Natural History Museum Basel is a natural history museum in Basel, Switzerland that houses wide-ranging collections focused on the fields of zoology, entomology, mineralogy, anthropology, osteology and paleontology. It has over 7.7 million objects.

It was established as a natural history collection in 1821.

The museum is a heritage site of national significance.

Here, the mummy of Anna Catharina Bischoff is kept and examined. It was found in 1975 during excavations in the Barfüsserkirche Basel. The skeleton of Theo the Pipe Smoker was found 1984 near the Theodorskirche in Kleinbasel.

See also
Museums in Basel

References

External links
 Natural History Museum of Basel website
 Basel museums website

Museums in Basel
Natural history museums in Switzerland
Cultural property of national significance in Basel-Stadt